Revson Fountain is a fountain installed in the Lincoln Center for the Performing Arts, a complex of buildings in the Lincoln Square neighborhood of the borough of Manhattan in New York City. The fountain was dedicated in 1964 and a redesign was completed in 2009.

History

Designed by Philip Johnson Associates, the fountain was dedicated on April 7, 1964. It was originally called the Lincoln Center fountain; its namesake is Charles Revson. The fountain was funded by the Revlon Foundation in 1962.

Diller Scofidio + Renfro, the lead architects of the 2006 renovation of Lincoln Center, made several proposals to redesign the fountain, eventually changing the perimeter bench to a floating granite disk; the fountain itself was rebuilt by WET Design from 2007 to 2009. Andrew Dolkart objected to the redesign: "It’s the thing that upsets me most of all about what's happened at Lincoln Center. They thought that they needed to spend a lot of money ripping out Philip Johnson's fountain and putting in something new instead of restoring something that worked well." The rebuilt fountain debuted on September 30, 2009, at a ceremony attended by members of Charles Revson's family.

Design

As originally designed, the fountain employed 568 jets and 88 lights with a combined illumination power of 26 kW. J. S. Hamel of Hamel and Lancer was credited with engineering the fountain. The core of the fountain was an array of 40 jets arranged in a  diameter circle around 16 lights capable of throwing water  in the air; there were two larger concentric rings with smaller jets outside the core.

The water level of the fountain was elevated from the plaza level in the original design, which used a curb and bench around the perimeter of the retaining pool; during the redesign, the water level was lowered to the level of the plaza and the bench was reduced to a circular rim floating on slim supports. The redesigned fountain contains 353 jets arrayed in three concentric rings and 272 lights with a total illumination power of 27.2 kW.

In popular media
Revson Fountain has been featured in several notable films set in New York City, including:
 The Producers (1967)
 Sweet Charity (1969)
 On a Clear Day You Can See Forever (1970)
 Godspell (1973)
 Manhattan (1979)
 Ghostbusters (1984)
 Moonstruck (1987)
 Sweet Home Alabama (2002)

In 2017, the water in Revson Fountain was dyed bright yellow during a prank.

References

External links

 

1964 establishments in New York City
Fountains in New York City
Lincoln Center